Franci Žbontar (born June 12, 1952) is a former Yugoslav ice hockey player. He played for the Yugoslavia men's national ice hockey team at the 1972 Winter Olympics in Sapporo and the 1976 Winter Olympics in Innsbruck.

His brother, Marjan Žbontar, played for the Yugoslav national ice hockey team at the 1976 Winter Olympics.

References

1952 births
Living people
Ice hockey players at the 1972 Winter Olympics
Ice hockey players at the 1976 Winter Olympics
Olympic ice hockey players of Yugoslavia
Sportspeople from Jesenice, Jesenice
Slovenian ice hockey forwards
Yugoslav ice hockey forwards
HK Acroni Jesenice players